Buta Zega Airport  is an airport  east of Buta in Bas-Uélé Province, Democratic Republic of the Congo.

See also

 Transport in the Democratic Republic of the Congo
 List of airports in the Democratic Republic of the Congo

References

External links
 FallingRain - Buta Zega
 
 HERE Maps - Buta Zega
 OpenStreetMap - Buta Zega Airport
 OurAirports - Buta Zega Airport

Airports in Bas-Uélé Province